Ben Moala Rural District is a rural district (dehestan) in the Central District of Shush County, Khuzestan Province, Iran. At the 2006 census, its population was 9,231, in 1,796 families.  The rural district has 16 villages.

References 

Rural Districts of Khuzestan Province
Shush County